Imma is a genus of moth. 

Imma or IMMA may also refer to:

People 
 Imma Battaglia (born 1960), Italian politician
 Imma von Bodmershof (1895–1982), Austrian poet
 Imma Mahfooz, Maldivian footballer
 Imma Monsó (born 1959), Spanish writer
 Imma Sirressi (born 1990), Italian volleyball player
 Imma Sumac (1923–2008), Peruvian–American soprano

Other uses 
 IMMA, Irish Museum of Modern Art

 Imma, a Rainbow Genie in Shimmer and Shine